Tarikh-i Bal'ami or Tārīkhnāmeh ('Book of History')  is the earliest known extant prose book in the Persian language written by Muhammad Bal'ami, a vizier in Samanid service. The 10th-century text is a universal history, spanning a period beginning with the dawn of creation through to the Islamic age. Having been translated into Turkish and Arabic, the book remained in circulation for a thousand years, and it is among the most influential books of Islamic historical literature. While the author claims the book is a Persian translation of al-Tabari's History of the Prophets and Kings, it is actually an independent work.

The literary style deviates from that of earlier Pahlavi and Middle Persian works composed in the Sasanian Empire. The Tarikhnama is considered the starting point of an influential Persian historiographical tradition that makes use of Arabic loanwords, and is based more on Arabic (and Islamic) models than earlier Sasanian ones.

Bal'ami started translating the book on 352 AH (963 CE). 

Various manuscripts of this book are today available in the libraries of Iran, India, Turkey and Europe, but none of them are complete and error-free. The oldest surviving manuscript seems to be from 7th century AH (13th century CE).

The book was translated into Persian language at the order of Mansur ibn Nuh, the Samanid amir. The book provides invaluable information about the Sasanian Persia and mythical history of Iran. Generally considered merely an abridged version of Tabari's work, A. C. S. Peacock demonstrated that Balami reshaped Tabari's work considerably, and that the differences between the two works are such that the Tārīkhnāma is essentially a new work.

See also 
 Shahnameh

References

Sources
 

Samanid Empire
Iranian books
10th-century history books
963
Persian-language books